"Yellow Boomerang" is a song by Scottish band Middle of the Road, released as a single in February 1973. It wasn't released in the UK, but was released in Europe where Middle of the Road had the most success. It was written by Italian brothers Giosy and Mario Capuano and Mike Shepstone (who had been the drummer for The Rokes).

Track listing
7"
 "Yellow Boomerang" – 2:46
 "Eve" – 3:13

Charts

Weekly charts

Year-end charts

References

1973 singles
Middle of the Road songs
RCA Victor singles
1973 songs